E633 may refer to:
 Calcium inosinate, a food additive
 FS Class E632, a sub-type of Italian locomotives